John C. Brenden was a Republican member of the Montana Legislature. He was elected for Senate District 18, representing Scobey, Montana in the 2009 and 2011 sessions. Due to redistricting he served District 17 from 2013 to 2016. He had previously served in 1993.  Brenden received a BA from Concordia College in Political Science/Philosophy.  He currently owns Brenden Farms.

References

Living people
Republican Party Montana state senators
People from Scobey, Montana
2008 United States presidential electors
2012 United States presidential electors
1941 births
21st-century American politicians
Concordia College (Moorhead, Minnesota) alumni